Paulo Jorge Morais Rebelo de Macedo (born May 28, 1968), is an Angolan former professional basketball player and a current coach. Macedo, who is 190 cm (6'2") in height, has been a prominent Point Guard both at the service of the Angola national basketball team and with Primeiro de Agosto. For Angola, he played at the 1986, 1990 and 1994 world championships as well as at the 1992 Summer Olympics. Moreover, he won the FIBA Africa championships in 1989, 1992, 1993 and in 2013 as a coach.

On May 30, 2012, he has been appointed head coach of the Angola national basketball team for the 2013 AfroBasket.

In January 2016, he was appointed head coach of Clube Desportivo da Marinha de Guerra.

As of June 2017, he has been the head coach of Clube Desportivo Primeiro de Agosto.

Awards and accomplishments

Coaching career
Primeiro de Agosto
3× FIBA Africa Basketball League: (2012, 2013, 2019)
2× Angolan Basketball League: (2013, 2018)
2×  Supertaça de Angola: (2013, 2014)

See also 
 List of FIBA AfroBasket winning head coaches

References

External links
 
 Sports Reference Profile
 Basketball Reference Profile
 RealGM Profile

1968 births
Living people
Angolan basketball coaches
Angolan men's basketball players
1990 FIBA World Championship players
Basketball players at the 1992 Summer Olympics
C.D. Primeiro de Agosto men's basketball players
Olympic basketball players of Angola
Point guards
Basketball players from Luanda
1986 FIBA World Championship players
1994 FIBA World Championship players